Ormenoides is a genus of North American flatid planthoppers in the family Flatidae. Usually adults are 7 to 7.5 mm in length and 2 mm in width.

Species
These 6 species belong to the genus Ormenoides:
 Ormenoides distincta
 Ormenoides laevis
 Ormenoides pauperata
 Ormenoides pehlkei
 Ormenoides subflava
 Ormenoides venusta

References

Flatidae
Auchenorrhyncha genera